Monroe Township is one of ten townships in Andrew County, Missouri, United States. As of the 2010 census, its population was 793.

The township was named after President James Monroe.

Geography
It contains five cemeteries: Bethel, Brown, Concord, High Prairie and Oak Ridge.

The stream of Long Branch runs through this township.

References

 USGS Geographic Names Information System (GNIS)

External links
 US-Counties.com
 City-Data.com

Townships in Andrew County, Missouri
Townships in Missouri